Shalika Aurelia Viandrisa (born 1 August 2003) is an Indonesian footballer who plays a centre-back for Italian club  and the Indonesia women's national team. She is the first Indonesian female player to sign for a club abroad.

Early life 
Aurelia began playing football aged 12, and played youth football for SSB Astam.

Club career
Aurelia went on trial at English club West Ham United in 2019, and German club Bayern Munich in 2021. 

On 10 January 2022, Aurelia joined Italian Serie B club , becoming the first Indonesian female player to sign for a club abroad.

International career 
Having represented Indonesia at under-16 level, Aurelia made her debut for the senior team in 2019. She represented Jakarta at the 2021 Pekan Olahraga Nasional. Aurelia was called up for the final 2022 AFC Women's Asian Cup squad.

References

External links

2003 births
Living people
Indonesian women's footballers
Women's association football defenders
Persija Putri players
Liga 1 Putri players
Indonesia women's youth international footballers
Indonesia women's international footballers
Indonesian expatriate women's footballers
Indonesian expatriate sportspeople in Italy
Expatriate women's footballers in Italy